Caremark Limited  is a home care services network of franchises specialising in both private-pay and state-funded home care.  It was founded by Kevin Lewis, Chief Executive, in 2005 and is based in Worthing.

History
Lewis established a care home in Brighton in 1987.  After the passing of the National Health Service and Community Care Act 1990 he saw opportunities to provide care to people in their own homes with an independent company which could be publicly financed by local authorities. 

In 2020 the business had 128 offices and employed about 6000 people. Most of the offices are in the UK, with 12 in Ireland, one in Malta and one in India. The Indian office, in Cochin provides free care in a home for 180 people who have been ‘abandoned’. 

In April 2020 the business was looking to recruit 3000 extra staff in the UK because of demand caused by the COVID-19 pandemic in the United Kingdom.   One of the staff from Guildford and Woking was gifted a free tank of petrol and a round of applause.  It is also actively recruiting in Ireland.

In 2022 it had more than 7,000 remote caregivers in 115 franchise offices.

Services
Services can include carers who live in the client's own home. 

In 2021 Caremark Gloucestershire started trials of ‘Genie’, a voice-activated robot which provides free video calling, welfare video monitoring with alerts, entertainment and access to online shopping and remote medical support for older people.  It  enables their customers to speak to and see their friends and family.

Influence

Criticism and awards
The Bradford franchise, which was providing care for 159 people, was rated inadequate by the Care Quality Commission in 2019 and placed in special measures after a high number of safeguarding alerts.  The Plymouth franchise got an ‘Outstanding’ rating from the CQC in April 2019.

Two staff from the Huddersfield franchise were nominated for the Great British Care Awards in 2019.

See also
Private healthcare in the United Kingdom

References

External links

 

Companies based in West Sussex
Social care in the United Kingdom
Elderly care
Franchises
Health care companies of England